The Northridge Blind Thrust Fault (also known as the Pico Thrust Fault) is a thrust fault that is located in the San Fernando Valley area of Los Angeles. It is the fault that triggered the  6.7 1994 Northridge earthquake which caused $13–50 billion in property damage (equivalent to 24–93 billion today) and was one of the costliest natural disasters in U.S. history.

References

Seismic faults of California
Geology of Los Angeles County, California
Geography of Los Angeles
Buried rupture earthquakes
Structural geology